Abuzeydabad (also Romanized as Abūzeydābād, Abū Zeydābād and Abu Zaidābād) is a city and capital of Kavirat District, in Aran va Bidgol County, Isfahan Province, Iran.  At the 2006 census, its population was 5,160, in 1,318 families.   People in Abuzeydabad speak a language called Abuzaydabadi language.

References

Populated places in Aran va Bidgol County

Cities in Isfahan Province